Ekaterina Alexandrova was the defending champion, but lost in the first round to Jessika Ponchet.

Anna Blinkova won the title after Karolína Muchová withdrew from the final.

Seeds

Draw

Finals

Top half

Bottom half

References
Main Draw

Engie Open de Seine-et-Marne - Singles